A superbill is an itemized form, used by healthcare providers in the United States, which details services provided to a patient. It is the main data source for creation of a healthcare claim, which will be submitted to payers (insurances, funds, programs) for reimbursement. 

There is no standard format for a superbill but it usually covers certain key information about the provider, the patient, and the type of care.

References

Further reading
 The Superbill-Guide to a Uniform Billing and-Or Claims System()by Medical Group Management Association Staff, Costello, William E.

Accounting source documents
Health insurance in the United States